The women's 24 kilometres points race competition at the 2002 Asian Games was held on 7 October at the Geumjeong Velodrome.

Schedule
All times are Korea Standard Time (UTC+09:00)

Results
Legend
DSQ — Disqualified

References

External links 
Results

Track Women points race